Parliamentary elections were held in France on 21 and 22 June 1863, with a second round on 5 and 6 July. Pro-government candidates won a majority of seats.

Results

References

Legislative elections in France
France
Legislative
France
France